The Crash Women's Championship (Campeonato Femenino de The Crash in Spanish) in professional wrestling is the promotion's female-based title. Lady Flamer is the current champion in her first reign. As a professional championship, it was not won by actual competition, but by a scripted ending to a match determined by the bookers and match makers. The promotion periodically declares a championship vacant, due either to a storyline or to a real-life issue (injury, retirement, departure from the company) that makes the champion unable to defend the title.

Title history

Footnotes

References

External links
  The Crash Femenil Championship

The Crash Lucha Libre championships
Women's professional wrestling championships